Macrobiotidae is a family of tardigrade. , it consists of the following genera:
 Biserovus 
 Calcarobiotus 
 C. (Calcarobiotus) 
 C. (Discrepunguis) 
 Famelobiotus 
 Insuetifurca 
 Macrobiotus 
 Mesobiotus 
 Minibiotus 
 Minilentus 
 Paramacrobiotus 
 Pseudodiphascon  (genus dubium)
 Pseudohexapodibius  
 Schusterius 
 Sisubiotus 
 Tenuibiotus 
 Xerobiotus 

The genera Adorybiotus and Richtersius were transferred from Macrobiotidae to a new family, Richtersiidae, in 2016.

References

Tardigrade families
Parachaela